Bernardo Mercado (January 16, 1952 – June 11, 2021) was a Colombian professional boxer briefly ranked as the top contender for the title of champion in 1980 by the WBC.

Born in Montería, Colombia, Mercado won a bronze medal in the light-heavyweight category at the 1974 Central American and Caribbean Games.

Mercado was once a sparring partner for Argentine heavyweight Oscar Bonavena, before turning professional on November 15, 1975.

Of his first 20 bouts, the  power puncher won 17 by knockout, nine in the first round. Mercado's first loss as a pro came in 1978, at the hands of future champion "Big" John Tate.

He went on to fight other future champions Mike Weaver and Trevor Berbick, knocking Berbick out in the first round of their meeting on April 3, 1979. In 1980, he earned a seventh round technical knockout over dangerous contender and multiple-time world title challenger Earnie Shavers and was ranked as the number one contender to Larry Holmes' WBC belt. He was defeated in an elimination bout with former champion Leon Spinks by 9 round technical knockout. He would go on to fight such name fighters as Randall "Tex" Cobb and Jimmy Thunder (with whom he fought in his last bout on December 8, 1989).

Professional boxing record

|-
| style="text-align:center;" colspan="8"|33 Wins (28 knockouts, 5 decisions), 5 Losses (4 knockouts, 1 decision)
|-  style="text-align:center; background:#e3e3e3;"
|  style="border-style:none none solid solid; "|Result
|  style="border-style:none none solid solid; "|Record
|  style="border-style:none none solid solid; "|Opponent
|  style="border-style:none none solid solid; "|Type
|  style="border-style:none none solid solid; "|Round
|  style="border-style:none none solid solid; "|Date
|  style="border-style:none none solid solid; "|Location
|  style="border-style:none none solid solid; "|Notes
|- align=center
|Loss
|33–5
|align=left| Jimmy Thunder
|TKO
|1
|08/12/1989
|align=left| Melbourne Showgrounds, Melbourne, Victoria
|align=left|
|-
|Win
|33–4
|align=left| Wesley Watson
|TKO
|1
|13/08/1988
|align=left| Bristol, Tennessee
|align=left|
|-
|Win
|32–4
|align=left| Wesley Smith
|KO
|4
|02/08/1988
|align=left| Central Plaza Hotel, Oklahoma City, Oklahoma
|align=left|
|-
|Win
|31–4
|align=left| Conroy Nelson
|UD
|8
|28/05/1988
|align=left| Saskatoon Place Complex, Saskatoon, Saskatchewan
|align=left|
|-
|Win
|30–4
|align=left| Jose Luis Gonzalez
|KO
|1
|06/11/1986
|align=left| Olympic Auditorium, Los Angeles, California
|align=left|
|-
|Win
|29–4
|align=left| Fernando Montes
|TKO
|8
|04/09/1986
|align=left| Olympic Auditorium, Los Angeles, California
|align=left|
|-
|Win
|28–4
|align=left| Fernando Montes
|TKO
|5
|07/05/1983
|align=left| Cartagena de Indias
|align=left|
|-
|Loss
|27–4
|align=left| Randall "Tex" Cobb
|PTS
|10
|06/11/1981
|align=left| Pittsburgh Civic Arena, Pittsburgh, Pennsylvania
|align=left|
|-
|Win
|27–3
|align=left| Gilberto Acuna
|TKO
|1
|13/06/1981
|align=left| Miami Beach Convention Center, Miami Beach, Florida
|
|-
|Loss
|26–3
|align=left| Leon Spinks
|TKO
|9
|02/10/1980
|align=left| Caesars Palace, Las Vegas, Nevada
|align=left|
|-
|Win
|26–2
|align=left| Tom Prater
|TKO
|12
|14/08/1980
|align=left| Bogotá
|align=left|
|-
|Win
|25–2
|align=left| Earnie Shavers
|TKO
|7
|08/03/1980
|align=left| Great Gorge Resort, McAfee, New Jersey
|align=left|
|-
|Win
|24–2
|align=left| Henry Clark
|PTS
|10
|03/08/1979
|align=left| Santa Monica Civic Auditorium, Santa Monica, California
|align=left|
|-
|Win
|23–2
|align=left| Fili Moala
|TKO
|6
|25/05/1979
|align=left| San Diego Coliseum, San Diego, California
|align=left|
|-
|Win
|22–2
|align=left| Trevor Berbick
|KO
|1
|03/04/1979
|align=left| Halifax Metro Centre, Halifax, Nova Scotia
|align=left|
|-
|Win
|21–2
|align=left| Tony Pulu
|TKO
|8
|14/02/1979
|align=left| Salt Palace, Salt Lake City, Utah
|align=left|
|-
|Loss
|20–2
|align=left| Mike Weaver
|TKO
|5
|22/10/1978
|align=left| Sahara Reno, Reno, Nevada
|align=left|
|-
|Loss
|20–1
|align=left| John Tate
|TKO
|2
|22/06/1978
|align=left| Madison Square Garden, New York City
|align=left|
|-
|Win
|20–0
|align=left| Horace Robinson
|PTS
|10
|24/02/1978
|align=left| Las Vegas, Nevada
|align=left|
|-
|Win
|19–0
|align=left| Fili Moala
|TKO
|8
|18/11/1977
|align=left| Caesars Palace, Las Vegas, Nevada
|align=left|
|-
|Win
|18–0
|align=left| Roger Russell
|KO
|1
|29/09/1977
|align=left| Madison Square Garden, New York City
|align=left|
|-
|Win
|17–0
|align=left| Battling Bob Smith
|KO
|2
|22/07/1977
|align=left| Cartagena de Indias
|align=left|
|-
|Win
|16–0
|align=left| Horace Robinson
|PTS
|6
|11/05/1977
|align=left| Madison Square Garden, New York City
|align=left|
|-
|Win
|15–0
|align=left| Randy Stephens
|KO
|2
|29/04/1977
|align=left| Fort Worth, Texas
|align=left|
|-
|Win
|14–0
|align=left| Dan Ronnell
|KO
|7
|10/03/1977
|align=left| Olympic Auditorium, Los Angeles, California
|align=left|
|-
|Win
|13–0
|align=left| Paul Solomon
|KO
|1
|15/02/1977
|align=left| Sacramento Memorial Auditorium, Sacramento, California
|align=left|
|-
|Win
|12–0
|align=left| Johnny Pouha
|KO
|1
|03/11/1976
|align=left| Silver Slipper, Las Vegas, Nevada
|align=left|
|-
|Win
|11–0
|align=left| Dan Ronnell
|KO
|6
|22/10/1976
|align=left| Los Angeles, California
|align=left|
|-
|Win
|10–0
|align=left| Earl McLeay
|TKO
|1
|05/10/1976
|align=left| Hyatt Regency, Incline Village, Nevada
|align=left|
|-
|Win
|9–0
|align=left| J.J. Woody
|KO
|3
|28/09/1976
|align=left| Yankee Stadium, Bronx, New York
|align=left|
|-
|Win
|8–0
|align=left| Battling Bob Smith
|KO
|1
|22/09/1976
|align=left| Las Vegas, Nevada
|align=left|
|-
|Win
|7–0
|align=left| MacArthur Swindell
|UD
|8
|19/08/1976
|align=left| Washoe County Fairgrounds, Reno, Nevada
|align=left|
|-
|Win
|6–0
|align=left| Manuel Ramos
|KO
|5
|13/05/1976
|align=left| Albuquerque Civic Auditorium, Albuquerque, New Mexico
|
|-
|Win
|5–0
|align=left| Mark White
|KO
|1
|26/02/1976
|align=left| Reno, Nevada
|align=left|
|-
|Win
|4–0
|align=left| Dave Martinez
|KO
|3
|12/02/1976
|align=left| Olympic Auditorium, Los Angeles, California
|align=left|
|-
|Win
|3–0
|align=left| Marlyn Johnson
|KO
|1
|08/01/1976
|align=left| Olympic Auditorium, Los Angeles, California
|align=left|
|-
|Win
|2–0
|align=left| Kenny Charles
|TKO
|1
|11/12/1975
|align=left| Olympic Auditorium, Los Angeles, California
|align=left|
|-
|Win
|1–0
|align=left| Harry Washington
|KO
|1
|15/11/1975
|align=left| Olympic Auditorium, Los Angeles, California
|align=left|
|}

Exhibition boxing record

References

External links 
 

People from Montería
Heavyweight boxers
2021 deaths
1952 births
Colombian male boxers
Competitors at the 1974 Central American and Caribbean Games
Central American and Caribbean Games bronze medalists for Colombia
Central American and Caribbean Games medalists in boxing
20th-century Colombian people